Busan–Gyeongnam Area, also known as Pusan–Kyŏngnam (PK) is the metropolitan area of Busan, Ulsan, and Gyeongsangnam-do (Gyeongnam) located in southeast South Korea.

History
Until 1963, before Busan become a "Directly Governed City", the whole area formed the Gyeongsangnam-do.

Economy
The GRDP in PK is 116,726 thousand KRW.

Population
PK has a population of 7,584,435, as of 2010. It is the second most populated metropolitan area after the Seoul Capital Area.

Administrative districts

Metropolitan cities
Busan
Ulsan

South Gyeongsang Province
Changwon
Yangsan
Gimhae
Jinju
Sacheon
Miryang
Geoje
Tongyeong

See also
List of metropolitan areas by population
Seoul Capital Area
Southeastern Maritime Industrial Region

References